Osek is a village in western Slovenia in the Municipality of Nova Gorica. It is located in the Vipava Valley in the Gorizia region of the Slovene Littoral.

The parish church in the settlement is dedicated to Saint Martin and belongs to the Diocese of Koper.

References

External links

Osek on Geopedia

Populated places in the City Municipality of Nova Gorica